Matija Popović (c. 1490-1563) was 16th-century Serbian Orthodox priest from Ottoman Bosnia. Popović was printer in the South Slavic Bible Institute.

Scribe 
Popović transcribed books written in Slavonic-Serbian language.

Printer at the South Slavic Bible Institute 
The South Slavic Bible Institute was established in Urach (modern-day Bad Urach) in January 1561 by Baron Hans von Ungnad, who was its owner and patron. Ungnad was supported by Christoph, Duke of Württemberg, who allowed Ungnad to use his castle (former convent) of Amandenhof near Urach as a seat of this institute.

Within the institute, Ungnad set up a press which he referred to as "the Slovene, Croatian and Cyrillic press". The manager and supervisor of the institute was Primož Trubar. The books they printed at this press were planned to be used throughout the entire territory populated by South Slavs between the Soča River, the Black Sea, and Constantinople. Trubar had idea to use their books to spread Protestantism among Croats and other South Slavs. For this task, Trubar engaged Stjepan Konzul Istranin and Antun Dalmatin as translators for Croatian and Serbian.

Language used by Dalmatin and Istranin was based on northern-Chakavian dialect with elements of Shtokavian and Ikavian. People from the institute, including Trubar, were not satisfied with translations of Dalmatin and Istranin. Trubar and two of them exchanged heated correspondence about correctness of the language two of them used even before the first edition translated by Dalmatin and Istranin was published and immediately after it. For long time the institute tried to engage certain Dimitrije Serb to help Istranin and Dalmatin, but without success. Eventually, they managed to engage two Serbian Orthodox priests, Jovan Maleševac from Ottoman Bosnia and Matija Popović from Ottoman Serbia. Two of them came to Urach on 20 September 1561. They confirmed that the prepared Cyrillic versions of the New Testament, Catechesis and other books were satisfactory. Because two of them were not skilled in typography, Ungnad sent them back to Ljubljana and gave a horse and 40 forints to each of them.

In 1562 Popović signed with ћ at the end of his signature, which is the same letter introduced by Vuk Karadžić at the beginning of the 19th century. At the beginning of 1563 Popović was killed in Žumberak by another Orthodox priest.

References

Sources 

 
 
 
 
 
 
 
 
 
 
 
 
 
 

1563 deaths
Serbian printers
Serb priests
Serbian Orthodox clergy
16th-century Serbian people
16th-century printers
16th-century Eastern Orthodox clergy
Serbs from the Ottoman Empire
Serbian murder victims
Habsburg Serbs
Year of birth uncertain